Shangqiu East railway station  is a railway station on the Shangqiu–Hangzhou high-speed railway in Shangqiu, Henan, China. Opened on 1 December 2019, it is the second high-speed rail station in the city after Shangqiu railway station.

References

Railway stations in Henan
Railway stations in China opened in 2019